Gaius Cassius Longinus (c. 86 BC – 3 October 42 BC) was a Roman senator and general who plotted to assassinate Julius Caesar on 15 March 44 BC.

Gaius Cassius Longinus may also refer to:
Gaius Cassius Longinus (consul 171 BC), fought in the Third Macedonian War
Gaius Cassius Longinus (consul 96 BC), mentioned by Cicero
Gaius Cassius Longinus (consul 73 BC), passed the lex Terentia Cassia
Gaius Cassius Longinus (consul 30), husband of Junia Lepida

See also
Cassius (disambiguation)
Cassius Longinus (disambiguation)
Longinus (disambiguation)